The George D. Stuart Bridge (commonly known as the Tarentum Bridge or the New Kensington Bridge) is a steel deck truss bridge that carries vehicular traffic across the Allegheny River between New Kensington and Tarentum in the U.S. state of Pennsylvania.

The bridge was officially renamed as the George D. Stuart Bridge in 1974 by the Pennsylvania State Senate in recognition of the World War I and World War II-era and post-war service of George Donnell Stuart in the Pennsylvania House of Representatives.

History
Originally named the Tarentum–Valley Heights Bridge, the structure is sometimes referred to today as the New Kensington Bridge. From its opening in 1952 until 1961, its maintenance was supported by a ten-cent toll. 

The name of the bridge was changed by the Pennsylvania State Senate in 1974 to honor George Donnell Stuart, a Republican who was elected to the Pennsylvania House of Representatives in 1944 and subsequently reelected in 1946 and 1948. Stuart, who had also been a member of Pennsylvania's Joint Legislative Committee on Mental Health Laws from 1947 to 1948, was a Tarentum High School graduate who had served in the United States Army during World War I and in the United States Army Reserve during World War II prior to his election to the Pennsylvania House. A publication assistant with The Valley Daily News from 1919 to 1920, he had also served as a Justice of the Peace in Brackenridge, Pennsylvania from 1922 to 1925 prior to becoming the editor of the New Kensington newspaper, the Valley News Dispatch, a position he held for half a century, from 1921 to 1971. During his state legislative tenure, he became known for his advocacy for bridge construction along the Allegheny.

See also
 List of crossings of the Allegheny River

References

External links
Sale, John. "Angler and Angles" (photo of fisherman standing at the water below the George D. Stuart Bridge). Pittsburgh, Pennsylvania: The Pittsburgh Press, October 9, 1983, p. 162 (subscription required).
Sale, John. "Straight and narrow" (photo of the George D. Stuart Bridge). Pittsburgh, Pennsylvania: The Pittsburgh Press, October 2, 1983, p. 145 (subscription required).

Bridges over the Allegheny River
Former toll bridges in Pennsylvania
Steel bridges in the United States
Road bridges in Pennsylvania
Truss bridges in the United States